Benjamin Victor may refer to:

Benjamin Victor (theatre manager) (died 1778), English theatrical manager and writer
Benjamin Victor (sculptor) (born 1979), American sculptor and Artist-in-Residence at Northern State University, South Dakota

See also

Victor (disambiguation)